São Miguel Paulista is a district in the subprefecture of the same name in the city of São Paulo, Brazil.

Roman Catholic Diocese of São Miguel

The Roman Catholic Diocese of São Miguel Paulista is a diocese located in the district, in the city and Ecclesiastical province of São Paulo in Brazil.

Marechal Tito Avenue
The arrival of the Central do Brasil Railroad improved transport connections with São Paulo and Rio de Janeiro, but road travel remained very difficult. In 1908 it took the French motorist Conde Lesdain (Comte de Lesdain) 45 days to complete the journey between the two cities by car.

Under his slogan "to govern is to open roads", Washington Luís, Mayor of São Paulo (1914–1919), Governor of the State of São Paulo (1920–1924) and President of the Republic (1926–1930), encouraged the expansion of the urban highways network, largely following the pattern laid down during the colonial era.  In 1922 he opened the São Paulo-Rio Highway, following one of the traditional colonial era routes and passing through São Miguel Paulista, Itaim Paulista and Mogi das Cruzes en route to Jacareí. In 1928 when the road was fully opened the journey took 10 hours.

The present name is given in tribute of the President of Yugoslavia who died in 1980.

Today the Avenida Marechal Tito is the main thoroughfare of São Miguel, lined by impressive buildings and serving all the town's most important facilities and attractions. The former diamond-shaped paving blocks have now been replaced by an asphalt surface.

Other important roads in the town are São Miguel Avenue, Jacú-Pêssego Avenue, Pires do Rio Avenue, Doctor Assis Ribeiro Avenue, Kumaki Aoki Avenue, Emperor Avenue, Oliveira Freire Avenue, Doctor José Arthur Nova and Nordestina Avenue.

University

The Cruzeiro do Sul University is a university located in the district.

References 
The information in this article is based on that in its Portuguese equivalent.

Districts of São Paulo